Rolf Gustafsson (December 18, 1906 – September 21, 1986) was a Swedish boxer who competed in the 1928 Summer Olympics.

In 1928 he was eliminated in the first round of the featherweight class after losing his fight to Georges Boireau.

External links
profile

1906 births
1986 deaths
Featherweight boxers
Olympic boxers of Sweden
Boxers at the 1928 Summer Olympics
Swedish male boxers
20th-century Swedish people